Bacillus pseudomycoides is a bacterium. The type strain is NRRL B-617T.

References

Further reading

External links

LPSN
Type strain of Bacillus pseudomycoides at BacDive -  the Bacterial Diversity Metadatabase

pseudomycoides
Bacteria described in 1998